Jiří David (16 February 1923 – 19 June 1997) was a Czech sprinter. He competed in the men's 400 metres at the 1952 Summer Olympics.

His wife was Olga Modrachová, a Czech athlete.

References

1923 births
1997 deaths
Athletes (track and field) at the 1952 Summer Olympics
Czech male sprinters
Olympic athletes of Czechoslovakia
Sportspeople from Brno